Star Wars: Force for Change is a Star Wars-themed charity program run by Lucasfilm and The Walt Disney Company that collects donations to fund solutions for global problems. The organization also sells Star Wars-themed merchandise using the profits for charitable causes.

History
Launched in 2014, the program worked closely with UNICEF by selling sweepstakes for the seventh Star Wars film of the saga Star Wars: The Force Awakens and raised approximately $4.2 million.

2015 campaigns
In addition to its recent campaigns was selling lucky draws to people who could make cameo appearances in The Force Awakens, some of the actors from the films such as Mark Hamill visited Los Angeles Children's Hospital, while Harrison Ford appeared in a charity video to surprise fans.

Fortieth anniversary announcement
To commemorate the fortieth anniversary of the Star Wars franchise, organization members Mark Hamill and Daisy Ridley appeared on Good Morning America announcing to fans that they could help Star Wars: Force for Change through UNICEF by going to Omaze and donating money to help children all over the world.

Collaboration with FIRST
In 2019, Force for Change announced that they were working with FIRST, a organizer of grade school robotics competitions, on FIRST's 2020 season. Due to this, the season was officially named FIRST RISE 2020.

References

External links
Force for Change on starwars.com

Charity fundraisers
Star Wars
The Walt Disney Company
Lucasfilm